Jacqueline Bouvier Kennedy is a 1981 American made-for-television biographical drama film starring Jaclyn Smith as Jacqueline Bouvier Kennedy, James Franciscus as John F. Kennedy and Rod Taylor as "Black Jack" Bouvier.

References

External links

Jacqueline Bouvier Kennedy at Complete Rod Taylor Site
Jacqueline Bouvier Kennedy at TCMDB

1981 television films
1981 films
1980s biographical drama films
ABC network original films
American biographical drama films
Films scored by Billy Goldenberg
Cultural depictions of Jacqueline Kennedy Onassis
American drama television films
1980s English-language films
1980s American films